From 1948 to 1975, the U.S. Army Chemical Corps conducted classified human subject research at the Edgewood Arsenal facility in Maryland. The purpose was to evaluate the impact of low-dose chemical warfare agents on military personnel and to test protective clothing, pharmaceuticals, and vaccines. A small portion of these studies were directed at psychochemical warfare and grouped under the prosaic title of the "Medical Research Volunteer Program" (1956–1975). The MRVP was also driven by intelligence requirements and the need for new and more effective interrogation techniques.

Overall, about 7,000 soldiers took part in these experiments that involved exposures to more than 250 different chemicals, according to the Department of Defense (DoD). Some of the volunteers exhibited symptoms at the time of exposure to these agents but long-term follow-up was not planned as part of the DoD studies. The experiments were abruptly terminated by the Army in late 1975 amidst an atmosphere of scandal and recrimination as lawmakers accused researchers of questionable ethics. Many official government reports and civilian lawsuits followed in the wake of the controversy.

The chemical agents tested on volunteers included chemical warfare agents and other related agents:

 Anticholinesterase nerve agents (VX, sarin) and common organophosphorus (OP) and carbamate pesticides
 Mustard agents
 Nerve agent antidotes including atropine and scopolamine
 Nerve agent reactivators, e.g. the common OP antidote 2-PAM chloride
 Psychoactive agents including LSD, PCP, cannabinoids, and BZ
 Irritants and riot control agents
 Alcohol and caffeine

History

Background and rationale
After World War II, U.S. military researchers obtained formulas for the three nerve gases developed by the Nazis—tabun, soman, and sarin—and conducted studies on them at the US Army Edgewood Chemical Biological Center. These studies included a secret human subjects component at least as early as 1948, when "psychological reactions" were documented in Edgewood technicians. Initially, such studies focused solely on the lethality of the gases and its treatment and prevention. A classified report entitled "Psychochemical Warfare: A New Concept of War" was produced in 1949 by Luther Wilson Greene, Technical Director of the Chemical and Radiological Laboratories at Edgewood. Greene called for a search for novel psychoactive compounds that would create the same debilitating mental side effects as those produced by nerve gases, but without their lethal effect. In his words,Throughout recorded history, wars have been characterized by death, human misery, and the destruction of property; each major conflict being more catastrophic than the one preceding it ... I am convinced that it is possible, by means of the techniques of psychochemical warfare, to conquer an enemy without the wholesale killing of his people or the mass destruction of his property.

In the late 1940s and early '50s, the U.S. Army worked with Harvard anesthesiologist Henry K. Beecher at its interrogation center at Camp King in Germany on the use of psychoactive compounds (mescaline, LSD), including human subject experiments and the debriefing of former Nazi physicians and scientists who had worked along similar lines before the end of the war. In the 1950s, some officials in the U.S. Department of Defense publicly asserted that many "forms of chemical and allied warfare as more 'humane' than existing weapons. For example, certain types of 'psychochemicals' would make it possible to paralyze temporarily entire population centers without damage to homes and other structures." Soviet advances in the same field were cited as a special incentive giving impetus to research efforts in this area, according to testimony by Maj. Gen. Marshall Stubbs, the Army's chief chemical officer.

General William M. Creasy, former chief chemical officer, U.S. Army, testified to the U.S. House of Representatives in 1959 that "provided sufficient emphasis is put behind it, I think the future lies in the psychochemicals." This was alarming enough to a Harvard psychiatrist, E. James Lieberman, that he published an article entitled "Psychochemicals as Weapons" in The Bulletin of the Atomic Scientists in 1962. Lieberman, while acknowledging that "most of the military data" on the research ongoing at the Army Chemical Center was "secret and unpublished", asserted that "There are moral imponderables, such as whether insanity, temporary or permanent, is a more 'humane' military threat than the usual afflictions of war."

The experiments
The Edgewood Arsenal human experiments took place from approximately 1948 to 1975 at the Medical Research Laboratories—which is now known as the U.S. Army Medical Research Institute of Chemical Defense (USAMRICD)—at the Edgewood Area, Aberdeen Proving Ground, Maryland. The experiments involved at least 254 chemical substances, but focused mainly on midspectrum incapacitants, such as LSD, THC derivatives, benzodiazepines, and BZ. Around 7,000 US military personnel and 1,000 civilians were test subjects over almost three decades. A concrete result of these experiments was that BZ was weaponized, although never deployed.

According to a DOD FAQ, the Edgewood Arsenal experiments involved the following "rough breakout of volunteer hours against various experimental categories":

An "Independent Study Course" for continuing medical education produced by the US Department of Veterans Affairs, Health Effects from Chemical, Biological, and Radiological Weapons (October 2003), presents the following summary of the Edgewood Arsenal experiments:

The "Independent Study Course" cites mainly a three-volume study by the Institute of Medicine (1982–1985) for its data and conclusions, Possible Long-Term Health Effects of Short-Term Exposure to Chemical Agents. Some additional information in the section cited from the Course was based on a 1993 IOM study, Veterans at Risk: Health Effects of Mustard Gas and Lewisite.

A significant omission from the Course summary above is the number of subjects on which BZ and related compounds were tested. According to the memoirs of James Ketchum, who also cites the IOM study for the data, "24 belladonnoid glycolates and related compounds" were "given to 1,800 subjects". The IOM study also concluded that "available data suggest that long-term toxic effects and/or delayed sequellae are unlikely" for this type of compound.

In the mid-1970s, in the wake of many health claims made regarding exposure to the agents, the U.S. Congress began investigations of possible abuse in experiments and of inadequate informed consent given to the soldiers and civilians involved.

Scandal and termination
In September 1975, the Medical Research Volunteer Program was discontinued and all resident volunteers were removed from the Edgewood installation. The founder and director of the program, Dr Van Murray Sim, was called before Congress and chastised by outraged lawmakers, who questioned the absence of follow-up care for the human volunteers. An Army investigation subsequently found no evidence of serious injuries or deaths associated with the MRVP, but deplored both the recruiting process and the informed consent approach, which they characterized as "suggest[ing] possible coercion".

Aftermath

Government reports
1982-85 IOM report
The Institute of Medicine (IOM) published a three-volume report on the Edgewood research in 1982–1985, Possible Long-Term Health Effects of Short-Term Exposure to Chemical Agents.

The three volumes were:
Vol. 1, "Anticholinesterases and Anticholinergics" (1982).
Vol. 2, "Cholinesterase Reactivators, Psychochemicals and Irritants and Vesicants" (1984)
Vol. 3, "Final Report: Current Health Status of Test Subjects" (1985)

The National Academy of Sciences, which oversees the IOM, sent a questionnaire to all of the former volunteers that could be located, approximately 60% of the total. The lack of a detailed record hampered the investigation. The study could not rule out long-term health effects related to exposure to the nerve agents. It concluded that "Whether the subjects at Edgewood incurred these changes [depression, cognitive deficits, tendency to suicide] and to what extent they might now show these effects are not known". With regard specifically to BZ and related compounds, the IOM study concluded that "available data suggest that long-term toxic effects and/or delayed sequellae are unlikely".

2004 GAO report
A Government Accounting Office report of May 2004, Chemical and Biological Defense: DOD Needs to Continue to Collect and Provide Information on Tests and Potentially Exposed Personnel (pp. 1, 24), stated:

[In 1993 and 1994] we [...] reported that the Army Chemical Corps conducted a classified medical research program for developing incapacitating agents. This program involved testing nerve agents, nerve agent antidotes, psycho chemicals, and irritants. The chemicals were given to volunteer service members at Edgewood Arsenal, Maryland; Dugway Proving Ground, Utah; and Forts Benning, Bragg, and McClellan. In total, Army documents identified 7,120 Army and Air Force personnel who participated in these tests.  Further, GAO concluded that precise information on the scope and the magnitude of tests involving human subjects was not available, and the exact number of human subjects might never be known.

Safety debates
The official position of the Department of Defense, based on the three-volume set of studies by the Institute of Medicine mentioned above, is that they "did not detect any significant long-term health effects on the Edgewood Arsenal volunteers". The safety record of the Edgewood Arsenal experiments was also defended in the memoirs of psychiatrist and retired colonel James Ketchum, a key scientist:

As late as 2014 incomplete information due to the failure to declassify and release relevant classified documents prevented IOM from conducting adequate medical studies related to similar former US biowarfare programs.

Even a book critical of the program, written by Lynn C. Klotz and Edward J. Sylvester, acknowledges that:

Unlike the CIA program, research subjects [at Edgewood] all signed informed consent forms, both a general one and another related to any experiment they were to participate in. Experiments were carried out with safety of subjects a principal focus. [...] At Edgewood, even at the highest doses it often took an hour or more for incapacitating effects to show, and the end-effects usually did not include full incapacitation, let alone unconsciousness. After all, the Edgewood experimenters were focused on disabling soldiers in combat, where there would be tactical value simply in disabling the enemy.

Lawsuits

The U.S. Army believed that legal liability could be avoided by concealing the experiments. However once the experiments were uncovered, the US Senate also concluded questionable legality of the experiments and strongly condemned them.

In the 1990s, the law firm Morrison & Foerster agreed to take on a class-action lawsuit against the government related to the Edgewood volunteers. The plaintiffs collectively referred to themselves as the "Test Vets".

In 2009 a lawsuit was filed by veterans rights organizations Vietnam Veterans of America, and Swords to Plowshares, and eight Edgewood veterans or their families against CIA, the U.S. Army, and other agencies.  The complaint asked the court to determine that defendants' actions were illegal and that the defendants have a duty to notify all victims and to provide them with health care.  In the suit, Vietnam Veterans of America, et al. v. Central Intelligence Agency, et al. Case No. CV-09-0037-CW, U.S.D.C. (N.D. Cal. 2009), the plaintiffs did not seek monetary damages.  Instead, they sought only declaratory and injunctive relief and redress for what they claimed was several decades of neglect and the U.S. government's use of them as human guinea pigs in chemical and biological agent testing experiments.

The plaintiffs cited:

 The use of troops to test nerve gas, psychochemicals, and thousands of other toxic chemical or biological substances.
 A failure to secure informed consent and other widespread failures to follow the precepts of U.S. and international law regarding the use of human subjects, including the 1953 Wilson Directive and the Nuremberg Code.
 A refusal to satisfy their legal and moral obligations to locate the victims of experiments or to provide health care or compensation to them
 A deliberate destruction of evidence and files documenting their illegal actions, actions which were punctuated by fraud, deception, and a callous disregard for the value of human life.

On July 24, 2013, United States District Court Judge Claudia Wilken issued an order granting in part and denying in part plaintiffs' motion for summary judgment and granting in part and denying in part defendants' motion for summary judgment. The court resolved all of the remaining claims in the case and vacated trial. The court granted the plaintiffs partial summary judgment concerning the notice claim: summarily adjudicating in plaintiffs' favor, finding that "the Army has an ongoing duty to warn" and ordering "the Army, through the DVA or otherwise, to provide test subjects with newly acquired information that may affect their well-being that it has learned since its original notification, now and in the future as it becomes available". The court granted the defendants' motion for summary judgment with respect to the other claims.

On appeal in Vietnam Veterans of America v. Central Intelligence Agency, a panel majority held in July 2015 that Army Regulation 70-25 (AR 70-25) created an independent duty to provide ongoing medical care to veterans who participated in U.S. chemical and biological testing programs. The prior finding held that the Army has an ongoing duty to seek out and provide "notice" to former test participants of any new information that could potentially affect their health.

Material Testing Program EA (Edgewood Arsenal) numbers
 
 
*EA 229 - Levinstein Mustard (H)
EA 773 - Agent TB
EA 1019 - Thiodiglycol
EA 1033 - Distilled Mustard (HD)
EA 1034 - Lewisite (L)
EA 1036 - O-mustard
EA 1152 - Diisopropyl fluorophosphate (DFP)
EA 1053 -  Nitrogen mustard 3
EA 1205 - Tabun (GA)
EA 1207 - O-ethylsarin (VX-G)
EA 1208 - Sarin (GB)
EA-1209 - Ethylsarin (GE)
EA 1210 - Soman (GD)
EA-1211 - GH
EA 1212 - Cyclosarin (GF)
EA 1213 - 2,2-Dimethylpropyl methylphosphonofluoridate (dimebu, neopentyl sarin)
EA 1214 - 2-Ethylhexyl methylphosphonofluoridate
EA 1221 - O-isopentyl sarin
EA 1224 - DMMP
EA 1230 - 2-Phenoxyethyl methylphosphonofluoridate
EA 1232 - Methylsarin
EA 1244 - O-Tabun-ethylenechlorohydrin
EA-1245 - O-methyl diethyltabun
EA 1246 - G-agent S
EA 1249 - 2-Methylpropyl methylphosphonofluoridate
EA 1250 - Diisopropyl methylphosphonate (DIMP)
EA 1251 - Difluoro, Difluor, DF or DIF
EA 1253 - Dichloro, Dichlor, DC, DCl or DICl.
EA 1255 - sec-butyl sarin
EA 1256 - A organophosphonate
EA 1258 - O-butylsarin
EA 1259 - A organophosphonate
EA 1261 - O-propylsarin
EA 1262 - O-hexylsarin
EA 1263 - O-decylsarin
EA 1264 - 4-(2,6-Dimethylheptyl) methylphosphonofluoridate
EA 1274 - 2-Pentyl methylphosphonofluoridate
EA 1277 - Excelsior
EA 1285 - Tetraethyl pyrophosphate (TEPP)
EA 1296 - Tenamfetamine
EA 1297 - Methylenedioxyphenethylamine
EA 1298 - Methylenedioxyamphetamine (MDA), an analogue and active metabolite of MDMA
EA 1299 - EA-1298 (S)-form
EA 1302 - 3-methoxyphenethylamine
EA 1304 - 3,4-methylenedioxyphenyl-2-butanamine
EA 1306 - Mescaline
EA 1316 - 3,4-Dimethoxyamphetamine
EA 1319 - alpha-Methylmescaline
EA 1322 - 3,4-dimethoxypropylamine
EA 1356 - (Racemic) 2-Methylcyclohexyl methylphosphonofluoridate
EA 1370 - G-agent
EA 1407 - Vomiting agent
EA 1464 - A quaternary ammonium carbamate nerve agent
EA 1465 - A THC derivative
EA 1473 - A quaternary ammonium carbamate nerve agent
EA 1475 - Methylenedioxymethamphetamine
EA 1476 - Dimethylheptylpyran 
EA 1477 - A THC derivative 
EA 1507 - A carbamate THC derivative 
EA 1508 - VG
EA 1511 - VP
EA 1512 - A V-agent
EA 1517 - VE
EA 1518 - A V-agent
EA 1519 - A V-agent
EA 1520 - A V-agent
EA 1521 - A V-agent
EA 1522 - A V-agent
EA 1523 - A V-agent
EA 1533 - A V-agent
EA 1542 - A THC derivative 
EA 1543 - A V-agent derived from THC 
EA 1544 - A THC derivative
EA 1545 - A THC derivative
EA 1576 - A V-agent derived from mevinphos
EA 1599 - V-agent
EA 1622 - O-Isopropyl S-(diethylaminoethyl) methylphosphonothioate
EA 1635 - V-agent
EA 1636 - V-agent
EA 1653 - LSD in tartrate form
EA 1664 - Edemo (VM)
EA 1671 - A solid V-agent
EA 1675 - A solid V-agent
EA 1676 - V-agent
EA 1677 - VS, a "V-series" nerve agent 
EA 1679 - V-agent
EA 1680 - V-agent
EA 1694 - EthylVx
EA 1695 - V-agent
EA 1697 - V-agent
EA 1698 - V-agent
EA 1699 - Vx (V5)
EA 1700 - V-agent
EA 1701 - VX
EA 1703 - V-agent
EA 1724 - QL
EA 1728 - V2
EA 1729 - LSD in free base form
EA 1763 - V1
EA 1778 - Nonanoyl morpholide
EA 1788 - Organophosphonate
EA 1779 - CS gas
EA 1811 - Quaternary oxime
EA 1813 - Quaternary oxime
EA 1814 - TMB4
EA 1821 - Pralidoxime iodide
EA 1941 - Quaternary oxime
EA 1972 - Dimethyl diglycolate (DG) 
EA 2012 - bis-Quaternary ammonium phosphonate
EA 2054 - bis-Quaternary ammonium phosphonate
EA 2071 - Pralidoxime lactate
EA 2092 - Benactyzine
EA 2097 - Benzylidene malonitrile (CS14632)
EA 2098 -bis-Quaternary ammonium phosphonate
EA 2129 - Respiratory irritant
EA 2148 - Phencyclidine (PCP)
EA 2170 - Pralidoxime Chloride
EA 2172 - A incapacitating agent
EA 2192 - VX O-hydrolysis product
EA 2214 - Respiratory irritant
EA 2216 - A incapacitating agent
EA 2217 - A incapacitating agent
EA 2218 - A incapacitating agent
EA 2219 - A incapacitating agent (analgesic potency = 63.3)
EA 2221 - A incapacitating agent  (analgesic potency = 158)
EA 2222 - Methylthiosarin
EA 2223 - Thiocyclosarin
EA 2227 - A incapacitating agent
EA 2228 - A incapacitating agent (analgesic potency = 200)
EA 2230 - A incapacitating agent (analgesic potency = 3125)
EA 2233 - Acetyl dimethylheptylpyran 
Eight individual isomers numbered EA-2233-1 through EA-2233-8
EA 2235 - A incapacitating agent
EA 2236 - Incapacitating agent
EA 2237 - A incapacitating agent
EA 2238 - A incapacitating agent
EA 2240 - A incapacitating agent
EA 2261 - Thio-EA-1356
EA 2264 - Incapacitating agent
EA 2265 - Incapacitating agent
EA 2276 - V-agent
EA 2277 - BZ ("Substance 78" to Soviets)
EA 2284 - Lacrimatory agent
EA 2302 - Lacrimatory agent
EA 2305 - Lacrimatory agent
EA 2306 - (-)-BZ
EA 2329 - Lacrimatory agent
EA 2333 - (+)-BZ
EA 2337 - Thiosoman (GDS or TGD)
EA 2361 - TGS or GSS
EA 2362 - Incapacitating agent
EA 2363 - Incapacitating agent
EA 2364 - Incapacitating agent
EA 2366 - Lacrimatory agent
EA 2389 - Incapacitating agent
EA 2391 - Incapacitating agent
EA 2392 - Incapacitating agent
EA 2393 - Incapacitating agent
EA 2405 - Incapacitating agent
EA 2407 - Incapacitating agent
EA 2413 - Lacrimatory agent
EA 2419 - Lacrimatory agent
EA 2422 - Incapacitating agent
EA 2433 - Lacrimatory agent
EA 2442 - Incapacitating agent
EA 2464 - Incapacitating agent
EA 2475 - Incapacitating agent (analgesic potency = 17860)
EA 2535 - Incapacitating agent
EA 2542 - 2-Bromoethyl bromoacetamide
EA 2545 - Incapacitating agent
EA 2580 - A incapacitating agent
EA 2613 - bis-Quaternary ammonium phosphonate
EA 2615 - Incapacitating agent
EA 2664 - Alkoxyarylamino analog of the Etonitazene (Analgesic potency = 312.5)
EA 3000 - Botulinum toxin 
EA 3148 - A "V-series" nerve agent, Cyclopentyl S-2-diethylaminoethyl methylphosphonothiolate ("Substance 100A" to Soviets)
EA 3164 - Incapacitating agent
EA 3167 - A BZ variant
EA 3171 - Incapacitating agent
EA 3176 - Lacrimatory agent
EA 3186 - Incapacitating agent
EA 3209 - A bis-quaternary ammonium phosphonate nerve agent
EA 3287 - Incapacitating agent
EA 3305 - 2,5-Dimethylcyclohexyl methylphosphonofluoridate
EA 3306 - Incapacitating agent
EA 3307 - A irritant agent
EA 3309 - Incapacitating agent
EA 3317 - V-agent
EA 3364 - Incapacitating agent
EA 3365 - Lacrimatory agent
EA 3367 - Incapacitating agent
EA 3382 - Incapacitating agent
EA 3387 - Incapacitating agent
EA 3407 - Incapacitating agent
EA 3430 - 2-Methylcyclopentyl methylphosphonofluoridate
EA 3437 - Respiratory irritant
EA 3439 - Incapacitating agent
EA 3441 - Incapacitating agent
EA 3443 - A BZ variant
EA 3473 - Quaternary ammonium analog of the Etonitazene
EA 3475 - Toxogonin
EA 3480 - Incapacitating agent
EA 3528 - LSD in maleate form
EA 3525 - Incapacitating agent
EA 3534 - G-agent
EA 3536 - Quaternary ammonium analog of the Etonitazene
EA 3547 - CR gas
EA 3561 - A blood agent
EA 3562 - A blood agent
EA 3563 - A blood agent
EA 3564 - A blood agent
EA 3565 - A blood agent
EA 3566 - A blood agent
EA 3567 - A blood agent
EA 3568 - A blood agent
EA 3569 - A blood agent
EA 3570 - A blood agent
EA 3571 - A blood agent
EA 3572 - A blood agent
EA 3580 - A BZ variant
EA 3625 - A irritant agent
EA 3631 - A incapacitating agent
EA 3632 - A blood agent
EA 3633 - A blood agent
EA 3634 - A blood agent
EA 3635 - A blood agent
EA 3636 - A blood agent
EA 3637 - A blood agent
EA 3638 - A blood agent
EA 3639 - A blood agent
EA 3640 - A blood agent
EA 3641 - A blood agent
EA 3669 - EA-1464 oxalate salt
EA 3695 - BZ analogue
EA 3729 - A blood agent
EA 3730 - A blood agent
EA 3731 - A blood agent
EA 3732 - A blood agent
EA 3733 - A blood agent
EA 3734 - A blood agent
EA 3735 - A blood agent
EA 3736 - A blood agent
EA 3737 - A blood agent
EA 3738 - A blood agent
EA 3739 - A blood agent
EA 3740 - A blood agent
EA 3741 - A blood agent
EA 3742 - A blood agent
EA 3743 - A blood agent
EA 3744 - A blood agent
EA 3745 - A blood agent
EA 3746 - A blood agent
EA 3747 - A blood agent
EA 3748 - A blood agent
EA 3749 - A blood agent
EA 3750 - A blood agent
EA 3751 - A blood agent
EA 3752 - A blood agent
EA 3753 - A blood agent
EA 3754 - A blood agent
EA 3755 - A blood agent
EA 3827 - Biphenacyl bis-Quaternary Ammonium Compound
EA 3828 - A bis-Quaternary ammonium carbamate nerve agent 
EA 3831 - Polymethylene bis-Quaternary Ammonium Compound
EA 3834 - A BZ variant
EA 3859 - Phenacyl Mono-Quaternary Ammonium Compound
EA 3861 - Phenacyl Mono-Quaternary Ammonium Compound
EA 3887 - A bis-Quaternary ammonium carbamate nerve agent
EA 3887-A - A bis-Quaternary ammonium carbamate nerve agent
EA 3940 - Palytoxin
EA 3947 - Biphenacyl bis-Quaternary Ammonium Compound
EA 3948 - A bis-Quaternary ammonium carbamate nerve agent
EA 3958 - Polymethylene bis-Quaternary Ammonium Compound
EA 3966 - A bis-Quaternary ammonium carbamate nerve agent
EA 3990 - A bis-Quaternary ammonium carbamate nerve agent
EA 4026 - A bis-Quaternary ammonium carbamate nerve agent
EA 4038 - A bis-Quaternary ammonium carbamate nerve agent
EA 4046 - Biphenacyl bis-Quaternary Ammonium Compound
EA 4048 - A bis-Quaternary ammonium carbamate nerve agent
EA 4050 - Biphenacyl bis-Quaternary Ammonium Compound
EA 4056 - A bis-Quaternary ammonium carbamate nerve agent
EA 4057 - A bis-Quaternary ammonium carbamate nerve agent
EA 4059 - alpha-methylene analog of the Etonitazene 
EA 4067 - Phenacyl Mono-Quaternary Ammonium Compound
EA 4075 - Decamethylene-2,9-Dione bis-Quaternary Ammonium Compound
EA 4076 - Decamethylene-2,9-Dione bis-Quaternary Ammonium Compound
EA 4079 - Biphenacyl bis-Quaternary Ammonium Compound
EA 4080 - Biphenacyl bis-Quaternary Ammonium Compound
EA 4081 - Biphenacyl bis-Quaternary Ammonium Compound
EA 4082 - Phenacyl Mono-Quaternary Ammonium Compound
EA 4113 - A analog of the Etonitazene 
EA 4129 - Dialkylamino analog of the Etonitazene
EA 4165 - alpha-Hydroxy analog of the Etonitazene
EA 4177 - A analog of the Etonitazene
EA 4181 - A bis-Quaternary ammonium carbamate nerve agent
EA 4196 - bis(diisopropylaminoethyl) disulfide
EA 4232 - Etonitazene precursor
EA 4243  - V-agent
EA 4245 - A analog of the Etonitazene
EA 4349 - Cyclooctyl methylphosphonofluoridate (Candidate G-agent S No.1)
EA 4352 - G-agent
EA 4557 - A analog of the Etonitazene
EA 4684 - Decamethylene-2,9-Dione bis-Quaternary Ammonium Compound
EA 4691 - Decamethylene-2,9-Dione bis-Quaternary Ammonium Compound
EA 4718 - Decamethylene-2,9-Dione bis-Quaternary Ammonium Compound
EA 4719 - Decamethylene-2,9-Dione bis-Quaternary Ammonium Compound
EA 4720 - Biphenacyl bis-Quaternary Ammonium Compound
EA 4789 - Phenacyl Mono-Quaternary Ammonium Compound
EA 4831 - Decamethylene-2,9-Dione bis-Quaternary Ammonium Compound
EA 4832 - Decamethylene-2,9-Dione bis-Quaternary Ammonium Compound
EA 4833 - Decamethylene-2,9-Dione bis-Quaternary Ammonium Compound
EA 4858 - Phenacyl Mono-Quaternary Ammonium Compound
EA 4859 - Phenacyl Mono-Quaternary Ammonium Compound
EA 4870 - A bis-Quaternary ammonium carbamate nerve agent
EA 4873 - Phenacyl Mono-Quaternary Ammonium Compound
EA 4874 - A bis-Quaternary ammonium carbamate nerve agent
EA 4879 - Phenacyl Mono-Quaternary Ammonium Compound
EA 4881 - Biphenacyl bis-Quaternary Ammonium Compound
EA 4882 - Phenacyl Mono-Quaternary Ammonium Compound
EA 4883 - Phenacyl Mono-Quaternary Ammonium Compound
EA 4885 - Phenacyl Mono-Quaternary Ammonium Compound
EA 4910 - Metonitazene precursor
EA 4913 - Decamethylene-2,9-Dione bis-Quaternary Ammonium Compound
EA 4916 - Alkoxyarylamino analog of the Etonitazene
EA 4919 - Biphenacyl bis-Quaternary Ammonium Compound
EA 4920 - Biphenacyl bis-Quaternary Ammonium Compound
EA 4921 - CHT inert isomer
EA 4922 - CHT inert isomer
EA 4923 - CHT gas
EA 4929 - Benzetimide
EA 4937 - Alkoxyarylamino analog of the Etonitazene (Analgesic potency = 55)
EA 4941 - Etonitazene (free base)
EA 4977 - Phenyl-Phenacyl Mono-Quaternary Ammonium Compound
EA 4978 - Phenyl-Phenacyl Mono-Quaternary Ammonium Compound
EA 4979 - Phenyl-Phenacyl Mono-Quaternary Ammonium Compound
EA 4980 - Phenyl-Phenacyl Mono-Quaternary Ammonium Compound
EA 4981 - Phenacyl Mono-Quaternary Ammonium Compound
EA 4984 - Phenyl-Phenacyl Mono-Quaternary Ammonium Compound
EA 4985 - Phenyl-Phenacyl Mono-Quaternary Ammonium Compound
EA 4986 - Alkoxyarylamino analog of the Etonitazene
EA 4987 - Phenyl-Phenacyl Mono-Quaternary Ammonium Compound
EA 4988 - Phenacyl Mono-Quaternary Ammonium Compound
EA 4989 - Phenacyl Mono-Quaternary Ammonium Compound
EA 4992 - Phenacyl Mono-Quaternary Ammonium Compound
EA 4993 - Phenacyl Mono-Quaternary Ammonium Compound
EA 4994 - Phenyl-Phenacyl Mono-Quaternary Ammonium Compound
EA 4995 - Phenacyl Mono-Quaternary Ammonium Compound
EA 4996 - Phenacyl Mono-Quaternary Ammonium Compound
EA 4997 - Phenacyl Mono-Quaternary Ammonium Compound
EA 5006 - alpha-Hydroxy analog of the Etonitazene (Analgesic potency = 17)
EA 5011 - Phenyl-Phenacyl Mono-Quaternary Ammonium Compound
EA 5014 - Phenyl-Phenacyl Mono-Quaternary Ammonium Compound
EA 5015 - Phenacyl Mono-Quaternary Ammonium Compound
EA 5016 - Phenacyl Mono-Quaternary Ammonium Compound
EA 5019 - Phenyl-Phenacyl Mono-Quaternary Ammonium Compound
EA 5020 - Phenacyl Mono-Quaternary Ammonium Compound
EA 5033 - alpha-Hydroxy analog of the Etonitazene
EA 5049 - Biphenacyl bis-Quaternary Ammonium Compound
EA 5094 - Phenyl-Phenacyl Mono-Quaternary Ammonium Compound
EA 5147 - Polymethylene bis-Quaternary Ammonium Compound
EA 5155 - alpha-Hydroxy analog of the Etonitazene
EA 5167 - Neuroleptic agent
EA 5194 - Neuroleptic agent
EA 5195 - Phenacyl Butanone bis-Quaternary Ammonium Compound
EA 5199 - Polymethylene bis-Quaternary Ammonium Compound
EA 5202 - Neuroleptic agent
EA 5211 - Neuroleptic agent
EA 5225 - Neuroleptic agent
EA 5236 - Phenacyl Butanone bis-Quaternary Ammonium Compound
EA 5243 - Phenacyl Butanone bis-Quaternary Ammonium Compound
EA 5244 - Phenacyl Butanone bis-Quaternary Ammonium Compound
EA 5245 - Phenacyl Butanone bis-Quaternary Ammonium Compound
EA 5265 - 2,4-Dimethylcyclohexyl methylphosphonofluoridate
EA 5270 - alpha-Hydroxy analog of the Etonitazene (Analgesic Potency = 1000) 
EA 5298 - Phenacyl Butanone bis-Quaternary Ammonium Compound
EA 5299 - Phenylenediacetyl bis-Quaternary Ammonium Compound
EA 5302 - 33% EA-3834B and 67% EA-4923
EA 5309 - Neuroleptic agent
EA 5310 - Neuroleptic agent
EA 5320 - Neuroleptic agent
EA 5340 - Neuroleptic agent
EA 5345 - Unsymmetrical bis-Quaternary Ammonium Compound
EA 5352 - Unsymmetrical bis-Quaternary Ammonium Compound
EA 5355 - Neuroleptic agent
EA 5360 - Neuroleptic agent
EA 5365 - G-agent V
EA 5366 - GV methylated  to iodide salt
EA 5371 - Phenylenediacetyl bis-Quaternary Ammonium Compound
EA 5382 - Phenylenediacetyl bis-Quaternary Ammonium Compound
EA 5389 - Thio-EA 5265
EA 5398 - Unsymmetrical bis-Quaternary Ammonium Compound
EA 5400 - G-agent X
EA 5403 - 1,1-Dimethylamino-2-propyl N,N-dimethylphosphoramidofluoridate
EA 5410 - GV-agent
EA 5414 - GV4
EA 5432 - Neuroleptic agent
EA 5443 -  A bis-unsymmetrical isoquinoline carbamate
EA 5444 - Neuroleptic agent
EA 5448 - Unsymmetrical bis-Quaternary Ammonium Compound
EA 5458 - GVX
EA 5471 - A bis-unsymmetrical isoquinoline carbamate
EA 5474 - A bis-symmetrical isoquinoline carbamate
EA 5475 - A bis-symmetrical isoquinoline carbamate
EA 5476 - A bis-symmetrical isoquinoline carbamate
EA 5478 - V-sub agent T
EA 5479 - A bis-symmetrical isoquinoline carbamate
EA 5480 - A bis-symmetrical isoquinoline carbamate
EA 5481 - A bis-symmetrical isoquinoline carbamate
EA 5482 - A bis-symmetrical isoquinoline carbamate
EA 5483 - A bis-symmetrical isoquinoline carbamate
EA 5484 - A bis-symmetrical isoquinoline carbamate
EA 5485 - A bis-symmetrical isoquinoline carbamate
EA 5488 - GV-O-Quinuclidinyl
EA 5490 - Unsymmetrical bis-Quaternary Ammonium Compound
EA 5492 - A bis-unsymmetrical isoquinoline carbamate
EA 5493 - A bis-unsymmetrical isoquinoline carbamate
EA 5494 - A bis-unsymmetrical isoquinoline carbamate
EA 5502 - A GV agent derivative
EA 5506 - A bis-unsymmetrical isoquinoline carbamate
EA 5511 - GV-agent
EA 5533 - V-agent
EA 5540 - Tetra-quaternary ammonium isoquinoline carbamate
EA 5579 - Tetra-quaternary ammonium isoquinoline carbamate
EA 5581 - Tetra-quaternary ammonium isoquinoline carbamate
EA 5582 - Tetra-quaternary ammonium isoquinoline carbamate
EA 5583 - Tetra-quaternary ammonium isoquinoline carbamate
EA 5584 - Tetra-quaternary ammonium isoquinoline carbamate
EA 5585 - Tetra-quaternary ammonium isoquinoline carbamate
EA 5586 - Octa-quaternary ammonium isoquinoline carbamate
EA 5615 - EA-5365 precursor candidate
EA 5636 - EA-5365 precursor candidate
EA 5696 - Morphine related compound
EA 5752 - IR metallic smoke
EA 5753 - IR metallic smoke
EA 5753D - Dedusted IR metallic smoke
EA 5755 - IR metallic smoke
EA 5761 - Organophosphonate binary
EA 5763 - IR metallic smoke
EA 5763D - Dedusted IR metallic smoke
EA 5768 - IR graphite smoke
EA 5769 - IR metallic smoke
EA 5774 - Soman binary
EA 5774-T - Thickened soman binary
EA 5823 - Sarin (GB) as a binary agent from mixing OPA (isopropyl alcohol+isopropyl amine) + DF
EA 5824 - EA-1356 binary
EA 5824-T - EA-1356 binary PMMA thickened
EA 5825 - Organophosphonate binary.
EA 5826 - Organophosphonate binary.
EA 5830 - EA 1699 binary.
EA 5852 - EA 1210 + EA 1356 binary
EA 5864 - Irritant agent
EA 5874 - Carbamate nerve agent
EA 5928 - Isopropyl tert-butylphosphonofluoridate 
EA 5944 - G-agent simulant
EA 5945 - G-agent simulant
EA 5957 - A mustard agent
EA 5968 - A IR graphite smoke
EA 5978 - Incapacitating agent
EA 5983 - A mustard agent
EA 5992 - A mustard agent
EA 5995 - Incapacitating agent
EA 5999 -  Titanium dioxide smoke
EA 6030 -  G-agent
EA 6043 - V-agent
EA 6095 -  A mercaptan related compound

See also
 THC-O-acetate
 CB military symbol
 United States chemical weapons program
 Edgewood Chemical Biological Center
 Human experimentation in the United States
 Swords to Plowshares
 United States v. Stanley

References

General sources
Two autobiographical books from psychiatrists conducting human experiments at Edgewood have been self-published: 
Men and Poisons: The Edgewood Volunteers and the Army Chemical Warfare Research Program (2005), Xlibris Corporation, 140pp, was written by Malcolm Baker Bowers Jr, who went on to become a prof of psychiatry at Yale. Bowers' book is a "fictionalized" account with names changed.
Chemical Warfare Secrets Almost Forgotten, A Personal Story of Medical Testing of Army Volunteers with Incapacitating Chemical Agents During the Cold War (1955–1975) (2006, 2nd edition 2007), foreword by Alexander Shulgin, ChemBook, Inc., 360 pp, was written by Ketchum who was a key player after 1960 and went on to become a professor at the University of California, Los Angeles.
The Vanderbilt University Television News Archive has two videos about the experiments, both from a July 1975 NBC Evening News segment. 
NBC newsman John Chancellor reported on how Norman Augustine, then-acting Secretary of Army, ordered a probe of Army use of LSD in soldier and civilian experiments. 
Correspondent Tom Pettit reported on Major General Lloyd Fellenz, from Edgewood Arsenal, who explained how the experiments there were about searching for humane weapons, adding that the use of LSD was unacceptable.
Journalist Linda Hunt, citing records from the U.S. National Archives, revealed that eight German scientists worked at Edgewood, under Project Paperclip. Hunt used this finding to assert that in this collaboration, US and former Nazi scientists "used Nazi science as a basis for Dachau-like experiments on over 7,000 U.S. soldiers".
A The Washington Post article, dated July 23, 1975, by Bill Richards ("6,940 Took Drugs") reported that a top civilian drug researcher for the Army said a total of 6,940 servicemen had been involved in Army chemical and drug experiments, and that, furthermore, the tests were proceeding at Edgewood Arsenal as of the date of the article.
Two TV documentaries, with different content but confusingly similar titles were broadcast:
Bad Trip to Edgewood (1993) on ITV Yorkshire 
Bad Trip to Edgewood (1994) on A&E Investigative Reports.
In 2012, the Edgewood/Aberdeen experiments were featured on CNN and in The New Yorker magazine.

Citations

External links
 Edgewood Test Vets: Vietnam Veterans of America, et al. v. Central Intelligence Agency, et al. Case No. CV-09-0037-CW, U.S.D.C. (N.D. Cal. 2009), Morrison & Foerster LLP, August 7, 2013
 Hunt, Secret Agenda: The U.S. Government, Nazi Scientists and Project Paperclip 1945-1991.
 Secrets of Edgewood, The New Yorker, December 26, 2012
  Edgewood/Aberdeen Experiments, U.S. Department of Veterans Affairs 
 David S. Martin, Vets feel abandoned after secret drug experiments, CNN, March 1, 2012
 Tom Bowman, Former sergeant seeks compensation for LSD testing at Edgewood Arsenal , July 11, 1991, The Baltimore Sun

Central Intelligence Agency operations
Chemical warfare
History of the government of the United States
Human subject research in the United States
20th-century military history of the United States
Military psychiatry
Mind control
Psychedelic drug research
Cannabis research
Cannabis and the United States military
Articles containing video clips